Scopula epiorrhoe, the silver-winged princess, is a moth of the family Geometridae. It was described by Prout in 1935. It is found in Japan (Kyushu), the Ryukyu Islands and China (Hong Kong).

References

epiorrhoe
Moths of Asia
Fauna of Hong Kong
Fauna of Japan
Fauna of the Ryukyu Islands
Moths described in 1935
Taxa named by Louis Beethoven Prout